Jumbo is a village in the province of Mashonaland Central, Zimbabwe. It is located in the Mazowe valley about 10 km north-east of Mazowe. According to the 1982 Population Census, the village had a population of 4,253 people. Ancient gold workings have been found in the area. The village grew around the Jumbo Mine, established in 1890.

Populated places in Mashonaland Central Province
.jumbo dam has an ongoing project of Acqua culture  and recreational facilities. It is located 12kms west of Mazowe  township.main activities  will be fish farming. Boat cruising and more activities